King's Highway 418, or simply Highway 418, is a controlled-access highway and former tolled highway in the Canadian province of Ontario. The freeway is located entirely within the Municipality of Clarington near Durham Regional Road 34 (Courtice Road).

The route number was confirmed by the Ministry of Transportation of Ontario (MTO) alongside Highway 412 on February 6, 2015. Prior to this, it was known as the East Durham Link. Highway 418 opened on December 9, 2019, alongside the extension of Highway 407 to Highways 35 and 115. On April 5, 2022, Highway 418 became toll-free.

Route description 

Highway 418 is a  four-lane tollway extending from Highway 401 to Highway 407E. The entire length of the route lies between Hancock Road and Rundle Road, east of Courtice. At the southern end, the route begins at a three-way interchange with Highway 401, from which it proceeds north. It then interchanges with former Highway 2.

North of former Highway 2, the route swerves eastward and crosses Solina Road. Just before a partial interchange with Taunton Road, the highway again swerves slightly eastward to the former alignment of Rundle Road. Immediately north of Taunton Road, the route ends at an interchange with Highway 407E, which is a toll route; ETC cameras present there.

History 

Highway 418 is the second of two freeways connecting the eastern extension of Highway 407 with Highway 401; the other is Highway 412, located to the west in Whitby. The two routes, known then as the East Durham Link and West Durham Link, first appeared as part of the June 2007 "Technically Recommended Route", which was submitted as part of the environmental assessment (EA) for the extension, but had been announced earlier that year on March 7 by the Government of Canada as part of an investment in Greater Toronto Area infrastructure.
The EA report was released on August 17, 2009, and included detailed plans for the configuration of the interchanges along the new freeway. The report also sought approval for the 6 lanes anticipated to be required by 2031.

On February 6, 2015, it was announced by the MTO that the East Durham Link would be designated Highway 418. On March 23, 2015, a C$1.2 billion contract was awarded for the second phase of the Highway 407 east project, which included construction of Highway 418. It was split into 2 phases, 2A and 2B. Phase 2A, which included the portion of the highway north of Taunton Road, was finished by December 2017 and opened on January 2, 2018. The portion that opened would be temporarily signed as part of Highway 407. The section of Highway 407 east of Enfield Road was temporarily closed on September 9, 2019, to reconfigure the ramps at the Taunton Road interchange in preparation for the opening of the remainder of the highway. The highway fully opened on December 9, 2019.

On February 18, 2022, the Government of Ontario announced that Highway 418 would become toll-free from April 5, 2022, together with Ontario Highway 412.

Tolling 

Highway 418 used the same electronic tolling system as Highways 407 and 412 and is part of the same provincially tolled section of highway as Highways 412 and 407 East. Heavy vehicles (those weighing more than 5 tonnes) were split into two categories: Heavy single units, which were tolled approximately twice the light vehicle rate, and heavy multi-units, which are tolled approximately three times the light vehicle rate. People using the highway may have used the 407 ETR transponders, which are still used throughout Highway 407, and light vehicles paid an additional video toll without a transponder. Heavy vehicles were legally required to have a transponder and may have been charged under the Highway Traffic Act if they did not. There was also a flat toll, which was $1 during off-peak and $2 during peak periods for light vehicles. Highway 418 became permanently free-of-charge on April 5, 2022.

Exit list

Gallery

References

External links

Provincial Project website for Highways 407, 412 & 418
Blackbird Infrastructure website for Project Phase 2, including Highway 418
Highways 401, 407, and 418

Roads in the Regional Municipality of Durham
18
Public–private partnership projects in Canada
Former toll roads in Canada